Friend is the special album released in 2002 by S.E.S. It is S.E.S.'s last album to be released in South Korea before going inactive, and then officially disbanding in the following year. The album was also released in some parts of Asia, including the Philippines, Hong Kong and Taiwan.

It contained one original song, the single "S.II.S (Soul To Soul)", but it was not promoted by the group.

The record has sold approximately 95,000 copies.

Track listing
 Intro (Dear My Friend)
 편지 (The Letter)
 S.II.S (Soul To Soul)
 Season In Love
 샤랄라 (Sha La La) -Remix-
 너를 사랑해 (I Love You) -Remix-
 Love Game
 Happiness
 꿈을 모아서 (Just In Love) -Remix-
 Choose My Life -Remix-
 S.II.S (Soul To Soul) -Instrumental-

External links 
  S.E.S.' Official Site
  SM Entertainment's Official Site

2002 greatest hits albums
S.E.S. (group) albums
SM Entertainment compilation albums